Jamia Ash'ariyya Islamic and Arts is an Islamic University located at Madavoor, Kozhikode in Kerala state of India.

References

External links 
 Map of Jamia Ash'ariyya Madavoor

Islamic universities and colleges in India
Universities and colleges in Kozhikode district